Al-Khisas, also known as Khisas or Khissas, was a Palestinian Arab village in the Safad Subdistrict in Mandatory Palestine. To the west of the village was a valley known as Wadi al-Hasibani through which ran the Hasbani River.

History

Ottoman era
Evidence of the long history of habitation in the village includes the nearby shrine of a local sage known as al-Shaykh 'Ali and the presence of rock-hewn tombs. The Arab geographer Yaqut al-Hamawi described al-Khisas as falling within the administrative jurisdiction of Banias in Syria. Under the Ottoman Empire, al-Khisas was administered as part of a sanjak in the vilayet of Damascus, and was later redesignated a part the vilayet of Sidon (renamed the vilayet of Beirut).

British Mandate
In 1917, al-Khisas lay north of the Sykes Picot line, a straight line between the midpoint of the Sea of Galilee and Nahariya in the area to be incorporated under a French sphere of influence. The Syria-Lebanon-Palestine boundary was a product of the post-World War I Anglo-French partition of Ottoman Syria. British forces had advanced to a position at Tel Hazor against Turkish troops in 1918 and wished to incorporate all the sources of the river Jordan within the boundaries of British controlled Palestine. Due to the French inability to establish administrative control, the frontier between Syria and Palestine became 'fluid'. The international boundary between Palestine and Syria was finally set by joint agreement between Great Britain and France in 1923 in conjunction with the Treaty of Lausanne, after Britain had been given a League of Nations Mandate for Palestine in 1922; thus, al-Khisas came under British jurisdiction.

In the 1931 census of Palestine the population of Khisas was 386, all Muslims, in a total of 73 houses.

Types of land use in dunams in the village in 1945:

The land ownership of the village in dunams:

1947-1948 and aftermath
Al-Khisas had been selected, along with Al-Na'ima and Jahula, by the Palmach as a target for a Haganah operation which was then cancelled before it was undertaken. Leaflets was distributed in villages on Palestine's border that warned the population not to engage in combat:

"If the war will be taken to your place, it will cause massive expulsion of the villagers, with their wives and their children. Those of you who do not wish to come to such a fate, I will tell them: in this war there will be merciless killing, no compassion. If you are not participating in this war, you will not have to leave your houses and villages."

On the night of 18–19 December 1947, the Palmach conducted a raid on al-Khisas with orders calling for "hitting adult [or the adult] males" and "killing adult [or the adult] males in the palace of the Emir Faur", which was thought to hide a man responsible for shooting a resident of kibbutz Ma'ayan Baruch in revenge for the shooting of a Palestinian a few days earlier. They blew up Faur's house and a neighbouring house, killing many occupants including women and children. According to Ben-Gurion, the raid was unauthorised. Local Jewish leaders and Arab affairs experts had tried to prevent the raid, but had been overridden by Yigal Allon. Afterwards the Political Department of the Jewish Agency criticized the attack and Yosef Sapir of the Defence Committee called for the punishment of those responsible, but no action was taken. Following the raid a large part of the residents left their homes.

The number of dead has been recorded as 10 (5 men, 1 woman and 4 children); however, the report from the Palmach commander recorded 12 dead (7 men, 1 woman and 4 children). David Ben-Gurion issued a denial that the raid had been authorised and issued a public apology, but it was later included by him in a list of successful operations. The Yishuv held a meeting on 1–2 January to discuss the policy of reprisal operations, the outcome of which was a formulation of guidelines by the Jewish High Command for the conduct and execution of retaliatory raids.

The first wave of villagers left the al-Khisas on 11 May 1948. Others left on 25 May 1948. Although 55 villagers remained in their homes and maintained good relations with neighboring Jewish settlements, they were eventually evicted. During the night of 5–6 June 1949, the villagers were forced into trucks and transported to the village of 'Akbara, south of Safad. Those expelled remained at 'Akbara for 18 years until agreeing to resettlement in Wadi Hamam. On September 26, 1948, kibbutz HaGoshrim was established on the village lands of al-Khisas. The kibbutz opened a hotel in the manor house of Emir Faour.

See also
Depopulated Palestinian locations in Israel
List of villages depopulated during the Arab-Israeli conflict
Killings and massacres during the 1948 Palestine War

References

Bibliography

 
 (pp. 56,  79  83- 84)

External links
Welcome to al-Khisas
al-Khisas, Dr. Khalil Rizk.
N.Y. Times: Haganah kills 10 in raid on Arabs

Arab villages depopulated during the 1948 Arab–Israeli War
District of Safad
Mass murder in 1947